The 2007 Porsche Tennis Grand Prix was a tennis tournament played on indoor hard courts. It was the 30th year of Porsche Tennis Grand Prix, and was part of the Tier II Series of the 2007 WTA Tour. It took place at the Porsche Arena in Stuttgart, Germany, from 1 October through 7 October 2007. Justine Henin won the singles title.

Finals

Singles

 Justine Henin defeated  Tatiana Golovin, 2–6, 6–2, 6–1

Doubles

 Květa Peschke /  Rennae Stubbs defeated  Yung-Jan Chan /  Dinara Safina, 6–7(5–7), 7–6(7–4), [10–2]

External links
Official website
Singles, Doubles and Qualifying Singles draws

Porsche Tennis Grand Prix
Porsche Tennis Grand Prix
2007 in German tennis
2000s in Baden-Württemberg
Porsch